New Zealand military ranks are largely based on those of the United Kingdom. The three services (Army, Navy, and Air Force) have their own rank structure, with a rank equivalency that allows seamless interoperability between the services. All three services form part of the New Zealand Defence Force.

Commissioned officer ranks

Rank insignia 
The rank insignia of commissioned officers.

Non-commissioned personnel 

Note: Naval other rank personnel are referred to by both their rank and trade. Thus a sailor employed as a chef would generally hold the rank of ordinary chef (OCH), with a few exceptions. A Warrant Officer with a trade of weapon technician would hold the rank of Warrant Officer Weapon Technician (WOWT).

Rank insignia 
The rank insignia of non-commissioned officers and enlisted personnel.

Definitions

Non-commissioned officer 
A non-commissioned officer is defined as:
"(a) In relation to the navy, a rating of warrant officer, chief petty officer, petty officer, or leading rank; and includes—
(i) A non-commissioned officer of the army or the air force attached to the navy; and
(ii) A person duly attached or lent as a non-commissioned officer to or seconded for service or appointed for duty as a non-commissioned officer with the navy:
 (b) In relation to the army, a soldier above the rank of private but below the rank of officer cadet; and includes a warrant officer; and also includes—
(i) A non-commissioned officer of the navy or the air force attached to the army; and
(ii) A person duly attached or lent as a non-commissioned officer to or seconded for service or appointed for duty as a non-commissioned officer with the army:
(c) In relation to the air force, an airman above the rank of leading aircraftman but below the rank of officer cadet; and includes a warrant officer; and also includes—
(i) A non-commissioned officer of the navy or the army attached to the air force; and
(ii) A person duly attached or lent as a non-commissioned officer to or seconded for service or appointed for duty as a non-commissioned officer with the air force:" — Defence Act 1990, Sect 2 (Interpretation)

Commissioned officers 
Officers of the New Zealand Defence Force are commissioned by the Governor-General of New Zealand on behalf of the monarch of New Zealand, King Charles III. See also Officer (armed forces). Salutes rendered to officers by junior officers and enlisted personnel are indirect salutes to the monarch, based on the officer holding the monarch's authority.

Higher flag ranks and ceremonial ranks 

Appointments to the most senior ranks (those above the rank held by the chief of the defence force, usually lieutenant general or equivalent) are ceremonial, for the head of state and members of the royal family.

References

External links 
 
 
 

Military of New Zealand
New Zealand and the Commonwealth of Nations
New Zealand Defence Force